Telmatobufo is a genus of frogs (false toads)  endemic to southern Chile. Their closest living relative is the monotypic helmeted water toad, Calyptocephalella gayi. These frogs were recently removed from the Leptodactylidae and placed in a new family, the Calyptocephalellidae. All three species of Telmatobufo that have been assessed by the IUCN are considered threatened.

Species
The four species are:
 Telmatobufo australis Formas, 1972
 Telmatobufo bullocki Schmidt, 1952
 Telmatobufo ignotus Cuevas, 2010
 Telmatobufo venustus (Philippi, 1899)

References

 
Calyptocephalellidae
Amphibians of South America
Amphibian genera
Taxa named by Karl Patterson Schmidt